Achanpudur is a panchayat town in Tenkasi district in the Indian state of  Tamil Nadu.

Demographics
 India census, Achampudur had a population of 12,407. Males constitute 52% of the population and females 48%. Achampudur has an average literacy rate of 64%, higher than the national average of 59.5%; with 60% of the males and 40% of females literate. 10% of the population is under 6 years of age.

References

Cities and towns in Tirunelveli district